Pilar Jáuregui Cancino (born 24 June 1988) is a Peruvian para badminton player who plays in international elite competitions. She was a Parapan American Games champion and has been selected to compete at the 2020 Summer Paralympics as her sport makes its debut. She was a former wheelchair basketball player who competed at the 2015 Parapan American Games.

Achievements

World Championships 

Women's singles

Mixed doubles

Parapan American Games 
Women's singles

Pan Am Championships 
Women's singles

Women's doubles

Mixed doubles

BWF Para Badminton World Circuit (8 titles, 3 runners-up) 

The BWF Para Badminton World Circuit – Grade 2, Level 1, 2 and 3 tournaments has been sanctioned by the  Badminton World Federation from 2022.

Women's singles 

Women's doubles

Mixed doubles

International Tournaments (2 titles, 5 runners-up) 

Women's singles

Women's doubles

Mixed doubles

References

1988 births
Living people
Medalists at the 2019 Parapan American Games
Peruvian para-badminton players
People from Puno Region
Paralympic badminton players of Peru
Badminton players at the 2020 Summer Paralympics
People with paraplegia
21st-century Peruvian women

Notes